The MSG Sphere London is a proposed music and entertainment venue to be built in the Stratford area of London, England.

History
The MSG Sphere London is a building project of United States-based The Madison Square Garden Company, and financed by former Cablevision owner Charles Dolan and his son, James L. Dolan. If approved, it will be identical to the MSG Sphere in Las Vegas, which is also backed by James Dolan, with an expected completion date in 2023. Both buildings have been designed by the architectural firm Populous.

Proposed features
The MSG Sphere would be equipped with a 19,000 x 13,500 pixel resolution LED screen which will spread across the interior of the venue. All 17,500 seats will have high speed internet access and the sound system uses a technology called beam forming to provide targeted, spatialized sound that is consistent in volume and quality across all seats. Haptic technology capabilities will be delivered through the floorboards. The exterior of the venue will feature 54,000 square metres of programmable lighting.  A 3,000 person club venue is under consideration as well.

Status
The venue is proposed to be located in Stratford near Westfield Stratford City, the East Village housing development, and the Queen Elizabeth Olympic Park, built on a site used as a coach park during the 2012 Summer Olympics. The sphere-shaped venue will be designed to have the world's largest LED screen and will have a seating capacity of 17,500. It is not designed for use as a sporting arena, but primarily for music, as well as award ceremonies, corporate events, and product launches.

According to the official MSG website, public comments were reviewed at the end of 2018 and a poll of local residents was conducted by Deltapoll in July 2019.

On 5 June 2019, the London Legacy Development Corporation (LLDC), the planning authority for the site, held a consultation with the public, during which residents emphasized their need for greater transparency regarding the project. MSG's most recent document submission to the LLDC was filed in August 2020 in relation to the Regulation 25 rules of the Town and Country Planning (Environmental Impact Assessment) Regulations 2017; all documents are available for review by the public.

The project gained planning approval on 22 March 2022 from the LLDC. The next steps comprise a review by the Mayor of London and a legal planning agreement. If those steps result in approval, then construction can begin.

In February 2023, the scheme was put on temporary hold by Michael Gove, Secretary of State at the Department for Levelling Up, Housing and Communities, using powers that potentially allow for a public planning inquiry into the project.

Opposition
Anschutz Entertainment Group (AEG), which operates the O2 Arena in south-east London, inquired about the Sphere's proximity to existing entertainment venues such as the London Stadium, the Copper Box Arena, and its own O2 Arena, emphasising that "it is imperative that MSG's proposals do not add to congestion in the area".

Others have highlighted that there is a shortage of affordable housing in the surrounding London Borough of Newham, which has more than 25,000 households on its waiting list. They claim that up to 1,400 homes could be built in place of the planned venue, and noted that plans for a "snow dome" ski centre in the same location, backed by former London mayor Boris Johnson, were scrapped in 2016. In January 2019, a group of local residents set up a website describing the reasons for their opposition to the Sphere project. On 14 June 2019, Hackney Council rejected plans by the Madison Square Garden Company to display giant illuminated advertisements on the dome of the sphere.

Transport links
The MSG Sphere will be accessible through a variety of mass transit links, including rail and bus. There are no proposals to extend Stratford Station or to provide parking.

Rail
The MSG Sphere London will be accessible via the London Underground's Central line and Jubilee line at Stratford station. Spectators will also be able to access the MSG Sphere via Docklands Light Railway at Stratford station and Stratford International station. The North London line of the London Overground and the Elizabeth Line also stops at Stratford station. National Rail and Crossrail customers will be able to access the venue via Stratford station.

Bus
Spectators will be able to access the venue via bus through the Stratford City bus station and the Stratford bus station.

See also
Avicii Arena
Cinematic virtual reality
MSG Sphere at The Venetian in Las Vegas, Nevada

References

External links

Music venues in London
Indoor arenas in London
Proposed indoor arenas
Stratford, London